Copromorpha mesobactris is a moth in the Copromorphidae family. It is found on Mayotte and La Réunion.

This species has a wingspan of 18mm for the males and 20mm for the females.

References

Natural History Museum Lepidoptera generic names catalog

Copromorphidae
Moths described in 1930